Electric Loco Shed, Jhansi is a motive power depot performing locomotive maintenance and repair facility for electric locomotives of the Indian Railways, located at Jhansi of the North Central Railway zone in Uttar Pradesh, India.

Operation
Being one of the electric engine sheds in North Central Railway, various major and minor maintenance schedules of electric locomotives are carried out here. It has the sanctioned capacity of 150 engine units. Beyond the operating capacity, this shed houses a total of 215 engine units, including 38 WAP-4, 117 WAG-5 and 65 WAG-7. Like all locomotive sheds, JHS does regular maintenance, overhaul and repair including painting and washing of locomotives.

Locomotives

References

Rail infrastructure in Uttar Pradesh
Jhansi
Transport in Jhansi
1987 establishments in Uttar Pradesh